The 1975 South Australian National Football League season was the 96th season of the top-level Australian rules football competition in South Australia.

Glenelg won the second semi-final and were premiership favourites. However Norwood won the grand final, their first premiership in 25 years.

Ladder

Finals series (Major Round)

Qualifying and Elimination Finals

Semi-finals

Preliminary final

Grand Final

Events 

 On 23 August (Round 17), Glenelg 49.23 (317) defeated Central Districts 11.13 (79), setting a new record SANFL score which still stands today. Gleneg's winning margin of 238 points is also still their biggest winning margin in SANFL history.

References 

SANFL
South Australian National Football League seasons